St. Luzisteig Pass (el. 713 m.) is a mountain pass in the Alps between the canton of Graubünden in Switzerland and Liechtenstein.

It connects Maienfeld in Graubünden and Balzers in Liechtenstein. Near the pass is a fortification that dates from the 18th century and is still used as a caserne by the Swiss Army.

The pass road has a maximum grade of 12 percent.

See also
 List of highest paved roads in Europe
 List of mountain passes

Luzisteig
Luzisteig
Mountain passes of Graubünden
Maienfeld
Fläsch